Vijayalakshmi (born 2 August 1960) is a Malayalam–language poet from the South Indian state of Kerala.

Life
Vijayalakshmi was born on 2 August 1960 in Mulanthuruthy village in Ernakulam district as the daughter of Kuzhikkattil Raman Velayudhan and Kamalakshi. She completed her education from Chottanikkara Government High School, St. Teresa's College, Ernakulam and Maharajas College. She completed her graduation in Biology and obtained her masters in Malayalam literature with a first rank from Kerala University. She is married to Balachandran Chullikkadu, a known Malayalam poet.

Literary career
Her  poem was first published in 1977 in Kalakaumudi weekly. During her graduation period, she won prizes in the Kerala University Youth Festival in story-writing and poetry.

She has published numerous poems in Malayalam. She was a member of the Executive Committee and General Council of Kerala Sahitya Akademi. She has also held various other posts in the Academy, such as its Advisory Board Member and the Convener of its Publication Committee. She also served as Vice President of the Samastha Kerala Sahitya Parishad.

Many of Vijayalakshmi's poems try to establish gender-equality and question the dichotomy on women. Literary critic M. Leelavathy lauds the concept of feminism in Vijayalakshmi as a continuation of the feminism of the Malayalam poet Balamani Amma.

Works 
 Mrigasikshakan (1992, Mulberry Publications, Calicut)
 Thachante Makal (1992, DC Books, Kottayam)
 Mazhathan Mattetho Mukham (1999, DC Books, Kottayam)
 Himasamadhi (2001, DC Books, Kottayam)
 Anthyapralobhanam  (2002, DC Books, Kottayam)
 Ottamanalthari  (2003, DC Books, Kottayam)
 Anna Akhmatovayude Kavithakal (2001, DC Books, Kottayam, Trans.)
 Andhakanyaka  (2006, DC Books, Kottayam)
 Mazhaykkappuram (2010)  (2010, DC Books, Kottayam)
 Vijayalakshmiyude Kavithakal (2010, DC Books, Kottayam)
 Jnana Magdalena   (2013, DC Books, Kottayam)
  Seethadarsanam (2016, DC Books, Kottayam)
  vijayalakshmiyude Pranayakavithakal (2018, DC Books, Kottayam)

Awards

1992: Lalithambika Sahitya Award
1990: Ankanam Sahitya Award 
1994: Kerala Sahitya Akademi Award 
1995: Vyloppilly Award 
1995: Changampuzha Award 
1995: Indira Gandhi Sahitya Award 
1997: V. T. Bhattathirippad Award 
2001: P. Kunhiraman Nair Award for Mazhathan Mattetho Mukham
2010: Bala Sahitya Institute Award
2010: Ulloor Award
2011: A. Ayyappan Poetry Award
2011: Krishnageethi Award
2013: Library Council Literary Award

2013: O. V. Vijayan Sahitya Puraskaram for Vijayalakshmiyude Kavithakal

References

Further reading

External links
 Vijayalakshmi: A devout feminist (Unnikrishnan Atiyodi in Kerala Calling March 2014)
 
 

1960 births
Living people
20th-century Indian poets
Malayali people
People from Ernakulam district
Poets from Kerala
Malayalam-language writers
Malayalam poets
Recipients of the Kerala Sahitya Akademi Award
Indian women poets
21st-century Indian poets
20th-century Indian women writers
21st-century Indian women writers
21st-century Indian writers
Women writers from Kerala
Maharaja's College, Ernakulam alumni
St. Teresa's College alumni